Rosario Orrego Castañeda (1834 – 21 May 1879), also known as Rosario Orrego de Uribe, Rosario Orrego de Chacón, and by her pseudonym Una Madre, was a Chilean novelist, poet, editor, and educator. She is considered Chile's first woman novelist, a pioneer in the poetic field in that country, and one of the forerunners of women's literature in Hispanic America.

She began her literary career as an editor at La Semana and founded the magazine Valparaíso in 1873, to which three of her children also contributed. 

She was also the first woman to join a literary academy: the Academia de las Bellas Letras in Santiago, formed in the mid-19th century by the Chilean intellectual elite.

Biography
The daughter of Manuel Andrés Orrego and Rosario Castañeda, Rosario Orrego Muñoz was born in the city of Copiapó in 1834. For most of her life she resided in Valparaíso, where she moved in 1853 after the illness of her first husband, the wealthy Chañarcillo miner Juan José Uribe.

Her marriage to Uribe took place when she was fourteen years old. They had five children, among them writers Ángela Uribe de Alcalde, Luis Uribe Orrego, and Regina Orrego Uribe (who was the first woman in Chile to receive the title of bachillerato in humanities).

After being widowed, she married jurist, journalist, and writer Jacinto Chacón Barrios in 1874.

Literary output
Rosario Orrego had a distinguished place in the field of Chilean writing during the second half of the 19th century, activity which developed almost entirely in Valparaíso. In addition, she participated in several literary and philanthropic organizations promoting women's rights. In this regard, during this time "she made clear her ardent intention and campaigned to expand the instruction and education of women, as well as a strong spirit of solidarity towards the most destitute of society."

She wrote in a series of magazines and newspapers throughout her life, among them La Revista del Público,  Sud-América, Chilena, La Semana, and the Revista del Pacífico – which she founded with her second husband, Jacinto Chacón. In 1873 she founded and edited the magazine Valparaíso.

In 1872, José Victorino Lastarria named her an honorary member of the Academy of Fine Arts in Santiago, making her the first woman in the history of Chile to join an organization of this stature.

Novels
Orrego's debut novel was Alberto el jugador, a text "of romantic court and custom where the atmosphere of the bourgeoisie is observed and the morals and social codes of the time are confronted." She published this in installments in the early 1860s in the Revista del Pacífico.

Her second novel – probably unfinished – titled Los busca vidas: novela de costumbres appeared in 1862. In it she showed a greater social concern and looked at the situation of women in social conflicts of the era, revealing "a deep knowledge of a boom time in Northern life when people came from everywhere to look for work and wealth, thus creating the rise of a mining bourgeoisie."

In 1870 she published Teresa, a romantic novel with political overtones that was set in the early days of the Independence of Chile and "breaks the conventional parameters of the approach to the subject of women in 19th century Chilean literature."

This trilogy transformed Rosario Orrego into one of the forerunners of the Hispanic American novel, together with Juana Manso, Mercedes Marín, Gertrudis Gómez de Avellaneda, Júlia Lopes de Almeida, Clorinda Matto de Turner, Juana Manuela Gorriti, and Mercedes Cabello de Carbonera, among others.

Poetry
She also ventured into poetry, a literary genre that she approached through several contributions to the magazine La Semana, which she signed with the pseudonym "Una Madre" (A Mother). During this time she had a self-critical sense of her work, saying, "I could estimate how little those poor verses were worth, because they were criticized in my presence." This anonymity lasted fourteen years, until in 1872 at the urging of her friends and editors, she chose to sign works with her name.

Journalism
In 1873 Orrego founded and edited the magazine Valparaíso, a bi-weekly periodical dedicated to the arts, letters and sciences. Here she published press releases along with her children Regina, Luis, and Laura. It was in this magazine that she published her third novel, Teresa. For her work, she is considered an important early figure in the development of journalism in Chile.

Select bibliography
 Alberto el jugador (Santiago: Editorial Cuarto Propio, 2001; 1860)
 Sus mejores poemas, artículos y su novela corta "Teresa" (Santiago: Editorial Nascimento, 1931)
 Obra completa: Rosario Orrego 1831–1879 (Copiapó: [s.n.], 2003)

References

1834 births
1879 deaths
19th-century Chilean women writers
19th-century Chilean novelists
Chilean women novelists
Chilean women journalists
Chilean women poets
People from Copiapó
Chilean socialites
19th-century Chilean poets